Sachsendorf may refer to a number of places in Germany

Sachsendorf, Saxony-Anhalt
Sachsendorf, Saxony

eo:Sachsendorf (apud Calbe)
nl:Sachsendorf (bij Calbe)
ro:Sachsendorf (bei Calbe)
ru:Заксендорф (Кальбе)
vo:Sachsendorf